Seringia hermanniifolia, commonly known as crinkle-leaved firebush, is a shrub of the family Malvaceae. It is a small shrub with blue-purple flowers and is endemic to  Western Australia.

Taxonomy
This plant was first described in 1821 by Jaques Étienne Gay as Keraudrenia hermanniifolia, but was allocated to the genus, Seringia, by Ferdinand von Mueller in 1860.

References

hermanniifolia
Plants described in 1821
Eudicots of Western Australia
Taxa named by Ferdinand von Mueller